The 2006 Istanbul Park GP2 Series round was a GP2 Series motor race held on August 26 and 27, 2006 at Istanbul Park in Istanbul, Turkey. It was the tenth And penultimate round of the 2006 GP2 Series season. The race weekend supported the 2006 Turkish Grand Prix.

Classification

Qualifying

Feature race

Sprint race

References

Istanbul Park
GP2
Auto races in Turkey
August 2006 sports events in Turkey